The British Dental Association (BDA) is a registered trade union for dentists in the United Kingdom.

Its stated mission is to "promote the interests of members, advance the science, arts and ethics of dentistry and improve the nation's oral health."

Structure
The majority of the BDA's 16,000 members include high street dentists, working in general practice providing both National Health Service (NHS) and private care, and those working in community and hospital settings, universities and the British armed forces.

The BDA's headquarters is in Wimpole Street, London near Queen's College, London in the City of Westminster and it currently has offices in Stirling, Scotland, Belfast, Northern Ireland and Cardiff, Wales.

History

In 1856 two dental societies were founded in Britain: the Odontological Society of London and the College of Dentists of England. The two societies merged in 1863 to form the Odontological Society of Great Britain and joined the Royal Society of Medicine as its Odontological Section in 1907.

By the 1870s leading dentists including Sir John Tomes and Sir Edwin Saunders (one of Queen Victoria's dentists) formed the Dental Reform Committee, to help bring unity, organisation and code of ethics to the dental profession. This Committee campaigned successfully for the first legislation to regulate dentistry, the Dentists Act, 1878 which limited the title of "dentist" and "dental surgeon" to registered practitioners.  Qualified practitioners and those who could show they had practised dentistry for five years prior to 1878 were the only ones eligible to register.

The Dental Reform Committee called for a nationwide meeting to establish the BDA in 1879 and established it in 1880. The BDA elected Sir John Tomes as its first President. Much of the BDA's early work involved prosecuting dentists in breach of the Dentists Act.

One active member of the BDA was Charles Edward Wallis, being on the association's representative board for six years. He also wrote extensively for the BDJ.

The Dentists Act of 1921 created the Dental Board of the UK to administer the Dentists Register. Thus the BDA was freed from legislation, and rapidly emerged as the leading consultative body and voice for the dental profession.

The 1921 Act introduced a provision that only registered individuals could practise dentistry.  However, unqualified practitioners were given opportunity to register if they could show they had been practising dentistry for five years prior to 1921.  The last unqualified dentist ceased practise during the 1970s.

In 1946 Lilian Lindsay became the first female president of the BDA.

Function
The organisation represents dentists at national and local level, ensuring that the views and concerns of the profession are high on the political and public agenda.

The BDA promotes good practice and patient care, and provides members with expert advice in all aspects of practice, management and opportunities for continuing professional development.

The organisation is also a scientific society promoting higher standards (often in co-operation with other organisations) and improvements in the oral health of the nation.

Publications
The BDA produces regular dental publications, including the British Dental Journal,   BDJ In Practice, BDJ Student and BDJ Team.

British Dental Association Museum
Its museum in Wimpole Street holds the largest collection of dental material in Britain. It includes dental instruments, equipment, furniture, photographs, archives, fine and decorative art. The museum is maintained as a national resource for the dental profession, dental industry, researchers and members of the public and aims to promote an appreciation of dentistry today through an understanding of its past. The museum is a member of the London Museums of Health & Medicine.

The museum also offers an enquiry and research service for individuals wanting to learn more about the history of dentistry or whether their ancestors were dentists. On several occasions the museum has also been used as a professional consultant on television series such as Call the Midwife.

British Dental Association Library
The Robert and Lillian Lindsay Library was opened in 1920. It was founded and organised by Lillian Lindsay, the first woman to qualify as a dentist in the UK.
The library is the most comprehensive dental library in Europe, and subscribes to over 200 dental journals and provides members with free Medline searches.

The Library is located at BDA Headquarters.

In popular culture
Arthur Lemming, special investigator for the BDA, is featured in a 1969 Monty Python's Flying Circus sketch.

References

External links

 

British dentists
Dental organisations based in the United Kingdom
Trade unions in the United Kingdom
Medical associations based in the United Kingdom
Medical museums in London
Museums in the City of Westminster
Organisations based in the City of Westminster
Organizations established in 1880
1880 establishments in the United Kingdom
Dental museums